Maver or Mavers is an occupational surname of Scottish origin, which means a steward, from the Gaelic "maor". It may refer to:

Abby Mavers (born 1989), British actress
John Boswell Maver (born 1932), Australian musician
Lee Mavers (born 1962), British musician
Marie Mävers (born 1991), German field hockey player
Rob Maver (born 1986), Canadian football player

See also
Darko Maver, fictional character created by Eva and Franco Mattes
Mawer

Scottish surnames